Rhynchodipteridae is a family of prehistoric lungfishes which lived during the Devonian period.

Phylogeny

 Sarcopterygii (Class)
 Dipnoi (Subclass)
 Rhynchodipteridae (Family)
 †Jarvikia (Genus)
 †Rhynchodipterus (Genus)
 †Soederberghia (Genus)

References 

Prehistoric lobe-finned fish families
Prehistoric lungfish
Devonian bony fish
Devonian first appearances
Devonian extinctions